Latvijas Universitātes Stadions was a multi-use stadium in Riga, Latvia. It was used mostly for football and rugby matches and was the home stadium of FK Rīga. The stadium had a capacity of 5,000 spectators.

References

Football venues in Latvia
Former buildings and structures in Latvia